Jazeel Castello (born 28 February 2000) is a Virgin Islander footballer who plays as a midfielder for the British Virgin Islands national football team.

Career

International career
Castello made his senior international debut on 14 November 2019, coming on as a 90th minute substitute for Carlos Septus in a 3–0 defeat to the Bahamas during the CONCACAF Nations League.

Career statistics

International

References

External links
Jazeel Castello at ESPN

2000 births
Living people
British Virgin Islands footballers
British Virgin Islands international footballers
Association football midfielders